The Kern shoulderband, scientific name Helminthoglypta callistoderma, is a species of air-breathing land snail, a terrestrial pulmonate gastropod mollusk in the family Helminthoglyptidae. This species is endemic to the United States.

References

Fauna of the United States
Helminthoglypta
Gastropods described in 1917
Taxonomy articles created by Polbot